The 2010–11 Lithuanian Football Cup is the 22nd season of the Lithuanian annual football knock-out tournament. The competition started on 23 May 2010 with the matches of the First Round and will end in May 2011 with the Final. Ekranas are the defending champions.

The winner of this competition will earn a place in the second qualifying round of the 2011–12 UEFA Europa League.

First round
The matches were played around 23 May 2010.

|}
The following teams received byes to the second round:

Euforija Vilnius, FTB Flintas Kaunas, Fortas Kaunas, FK Kiemas Vilnius, FK Olimpija Vilnius, FK Ozo Tapyrai Vilnius, Pagėgiai, FK Perfectus Sport Marijampolė, FK Pipirini Rokiškis, FK Reo LT Vilnius, FK Sakuona-Klarksonas Plikiai, FK Tauras Šiauliai, Visas Labas Kaunas

Second round
The matches were played around 13 June 2010.

|}

Third round
The matches were played around 11 July 2010.

|}

Fourth round
FK Tauras Šiauliai received a bye to the Fifth Round. These matches were played on 3, 4 and 10 August 2010.

|}

Fifth round
These matches took place on 24 and 25 August 2010.

|}

Sixth Round
These matches took place on 29 September and 2 October 2010

|}

Quarterfinals
These matches took place on 3 November 2010.

|}

Semifinals
The 4 winners from the previous round entered this stage of the competition. Unlike the previous rounds of the competition, this was played over two legs. The first legs were played on 16 March 2011 and the second legs were played on 13 April 2011.

|}

Final
The final of the 2010/11 Lithuanian Football Cup took place on 14 May 2011.

|}

References

External links
 omnitel.net

Cup
Cup
2010–11 domestic association football cups
2010-11